Julio Giambruno Viana (born April 17, 1946) is a retired Uruguayan diplomat.

Career
From 1965 to 1975 he was Technical Assistant at the Latin American Integration Association
From / to 1986 he was Deputy Consul General in New York City.
From 7 January 1987 to 1991 he was Chargé d'affaires in Canberra.
On Oct. 17, 1995 he got Exequatur as Consul General in San Francisco.
From  to 2003 he was ambassador in Seoul.
In 2004 he was Director General para Asuntos Culturales del Ministerio de Relaciones Exteriores.
From  to  he was ambassador in Warsaw.

References

1946 births
Living people
Ambassadors of Uruguay to South Korea
Ambassadors of Uruguay to Poland
Ambassadors of Uruguay to Lithuania
Ambassadors of Uruguay to Ukraine
Ambassadors of Uruguay to Belarus